A landlord is the owner of a house, apartment, condominium, land, or real estate which is rented or leased to an individual or business, who is called a tenant (also a lessee or renter).  When a juristic person is in this position, the term landlord is used. Other terms include lessor and owner. The term landlady may be used for the female owners. The manager of a pub in the United Kingdom, strictly speaking a licensed victualler, is referred to as the landlord/landlady. In political economy it refers to the owner of natural resources alone (e.g., land, not buildings) from which an economic rent, a form of passive income, is the income received.

History
The concept of a landlord may be traced back to the feudal system of manoralism (seignorialism), where a landed estate is owned by a Lord of the Manor (mesne lords), usually members of the lower nobility which came to form the rank of knights in the high medieval period, holding their fief via subinfeudation, but in some cases the land may also be directly subject to a member of higher nobility, as in the royal domain directly owned by a king, or in the Holy Roman Empire imperial villages directly subject to the emperor. The medieval system ultimately continues the system of villas and latifundia (peasant-worked broad farmsteads) of the Roman Empire.

In modern times, "landlord" describes any individual, or entity such as a government body or an institution, who charges rent to a person living in a home they do not own.

Owner and tenant responsibilities
A rental agreement, or lease, is the contract defining such terms as the price paid, penalties for late payments, the length of the rental or lease, and the amount of notice required before either the homeowner or tenant cancels the agreement.  In general, responsibilities are given as follows: the homeowner is responsible for making repairs and performing property maintenance, and the tenant is responsible for keeping the property clean and safe.

Many owners hire a property management company to take care of all the details of renting their property out to a tenant. This usually includes advertising the property and showing it to prospective tenants, negotiating and preparing the written leases or license agreements, and then, once rented, collecting rent from the tenant and performing repairs as needed.

United States
In the United States, residential homeowner–tenant disputes are primarily governed by state law (not federal law) regarding property and contracts.  State law and, in some places, city law or county law, sets the requirements for eviction of a tenant.  Generally, there are a limited number of reasons for which a landlord or landlady can evict his or her tenant before the expiration of the tenancy, though at the end of the lease term the rental relationship can generally be terminated without giving any reason. Some cities, counties, and states have laws establishing the maximum rent a landlord can charge, known as rent control, or rent regulation, and related eviction. There is also an implied warranty of habitability, whereby a landlord must maintain safe, decent and habitable housing, meeting minimum safety requirements such as smoke detectors and a locking door. The most common disputes result from either the landlord's failure to provide services or the tenant's failure to pay rent—the former can also lead to the latter. The withholding of rent is justifiable cause for eviction, as often explained in the lease.

Canada
In Canada, residential homeowner–tenant disputes are primarily governed by provincial law (not federal law) regarding property and contracts. Provincial law sets the requirements for eviction of a tenant. Generally, there are a limited number of reasons for which a landlord can evict a tenant. Some provinces have laws establishing the maximum rent a landlord can charge, known as rent control, or rent regulation, and related eviction. There is also an implied warranty of habitability, whereby a landlord must maintain safe, decent and habitable housing, meeting minimum safety requirements.

United Kingdom

Residential rental market (tenancies)
Private sector renting is largely governed by many of the Landlord and Tenant Acts, in particular the Landlord and Tenant Act 1985 which sets bare minimum standards in tenants' rights against their landlords. Another key statute is the Housing Act 2004. Rents can be freely increased at the end of a usual six-month duration, on proper notice given to the tenant. A Possession Order under the most common type, the assured shorthold tenancy (AST) is usually obtainable after eight weeks/two months of unpaid rent, and at the court's discretion after serving the tenant with a Section 8 notice (under the Housing Act 1988 as amended) for a lesser period for all assured tenancies — and on other grounds which defer to the landlord's ownership of the property. If the tenancy is an AST then any possession order will not take effect until six months has passed into the initial tenancy. A tenancy of someone who has been in occupation since before 15 January 1989 usually, if not a shorthold from the outset following their inception from 1980 onwards, may be a "regulated tenancy" with many more rights, especially under the Rent Act 1977 and Protection from Eviction Act 1977, introduced by the Third Wilson ministry.

Each house in multiple occupation, a unit the law does not regard it as a single household having more than three tenants, is subject to enhanced regulations including the Housing Act 2004. A council-issued licence to be a landlord of such a unit is always required in some local authorities (in others, limited to the larger statutory examples).

Residential leasehold
Tenancies above a couple of years are normally called leases and tend to be lengthy; if more than seven years a new leasehold estate must be registered. These are governed by few of the above rules and are in longer examples deliberately more akin to full ownership than tenancies, in general. They seldom require a sizeable ground rent. The law has not regulated hefty break/resale charges nor does it prevent the sale of leasehold houses; in the 2010s certain of these proposals have been widely consulted upon and are being drafted. Broadly, legislation allows such lessees (tenants) to club together to gain the Right to Manage, and the right to buy the landlord's interest (to collectively enfranchise). It allows them individually to extend their leases for a new, smaller sum ("premium"), which if the tenants have enfranchised will not normally be demanded/recommended every 15–35 years.  Notice requirements and forms tend to be strict. In smaller examples the tenant, depending on a simple mathematical division of the building, may be able to enfranchise individually. Statute of 1925 implies into nearly all leases (tenancies at low rent and at a premium (fine, initial large sum)) of property that they can be sold (by the lessee, assigned); reducing any restriction to one whereby the landlord may apply standard that is "reasonable" vetting, without causing major delay. This is often known as the "statutory qualified covenant on assignment/alienation".

In the overall diminishing domain of social housing, exceptionally, lessees widely acquire over time the Right to Buy for a fixed discount on the market price of the home.

Commercial (business) leases and tenancies
In commercial property much of the law, especially as to disputes and basic responsibilities, is based on freedom of contract of the common law including the implied terms of precedent decisions of wide-ranging case law such as the meaning of "good and substantial repair". Implied principles include "non-derogation from grant" and "quiet enjoyment". All businesses which are tenants (lessees) must decide whether to contract in or outside of Part II of the Landlord and Tenant Act 1954 which gives them "business security of tenure". If not, it generally applies by default. This "security of tenure" is expressly subject to common reasons and associated mechanisms for a landlord to obtain back the premises. If a landlord is selling a block and a qualifying tenant occupies more than 50%, the tenant should be given the right of first refusal at the asking price to buy the block. As in most jurisdictions the law on rigorous adherence to lease terms on unlawful subletting and assignment can be strictly enforced, resulting in financial and premises loss if broken. Failure to repay a rent demand, unlike residential, can result in direct landlord's repossession ("peaceable re-entry") through a commercial landlord's right to the use of "self-help" evictions. The taking of a tenant's goods without a court-issued warrant (flowing from a court order or outstanding tax demand) (distress) has been banned.

Criticism of landlords

Landownership 
The concept of land ownership is not universal. Many Native American tribes did not view land as a commodity whereas many Europeans colonizers did. Ownership of land in the pre-colonial Americas varied from tribe to tribe, but many Native American societies had communal and individual land. 

Some European scholars also were skeptical of land ownership, such as Adam Smith and Henry George. Adam Smith said about landlords, “As soon as the land of any country has all become private property, the landlords—like all other men—love to reap where they never sowed, and demand a rent even for their land’s natural product.”  Henry George believed land belonged to everyone and supported a public tax on economic rent, which he believed would be so profitable that all other taxes would be abolished.

Monopolies 
Another common criticism of landlords is the tendency for monopolization. Without regulation, corporations are able to use their purchasing power to buy up housing stock, sometimes up to 90% of the houses in a zip code.  Corporate landlords are able to buy foreclosed houses and rent the house back to the original owner.  Another form of corporate monopolization and housing are company towns. In these towns, one corporation owns the vast majority of housing and businesses. Since these corporations employ most of the residents of the town, they are able to raise rent and lower wages during a recession.

Slum landlord 

Renters (tenants or other licensees) at the lowest end of the payment scale may be in social or economic difficulty and suffer significant social stigma as a consequence. Due to lack of alternative options, such renters are often the victims of unscrupulous owners of unsafe and decrepit properties who neglect their responsibility to maintain the property.

The terms "slumlord", "slum landlord", or "ghetto landlord" is used to describe landlords of large numbers of such properties, often holding a virtual local monopoly. Public improvement or major private investment can improve such areas. In extreme situations, government compulsory purchase powers in many countries enable slum clearance to replace or renovate the worst of neighbourhoods.

Examples:

 Peter Rachman was a landlord who operated in Notting Hill, London, in the 1950s and until his 1962 death. He became notorious for exploitation of his tenants, with the word "Rachmanism" entering the Oxford English Dictionary. His henchmen included Michael de Freitas (aka Michael X/Abdul Malik), who created a reputation as a black-power leader, and Johnny Edgecombe, who became a promoter of jazz and blues, which helped to keep him in the limelight.

Accidental landlord
The term 'accidental landlord' is used for landlords who do not initially intend to become a landlord but have a spare property (from inheriting it, moving in with a partner, or unable to sell when moving), and then choose to let the property instead of selling.

Rental investment and basis
Incentives and disincentives
The incentive is to obtain a good rental yield (profit) and prospect of property price inflation. The disincentives are the locally varying rights of tenants and duties of landlords in repair/maintenance and administration — and keynote risks (tenant disputes, damage, neglect, loss of rent, insurance inavailability/disputes, economic slump, increased rate of interest on any mortgage, and negative equity or loss of investment). Net income (yield) and capital growth from letting (renting out) particularly in leveraged buy to let, is subject to idiosyncratic risk, which is considered objectively intensified for a highly leveraged investor limited to a small number of similar profile homes, of narrow rental market appeal in areas lacking economic resilience.

Basis
Rental properties can be paid for by the tenant on whatever basis agreed between the landlord and the tenant — more frequently than weekly or less than yearly is almost unheard of — and which is always included in the lease agreement (preferably for both sides in writing). It should be one of the factors that a tenant considers before moving in.

Security for rent and extra fees

A landlord or their agent can decide to collect a security deposit (and/or in some jurisdictions such as parts of the US, a move-in/administration fee). A barrier if high and a relative attractive if low in many markets for a tenant, it is rarely debated in pre-tenancy term negotiations. In some jurisdictions either or both are banned in the original sense. Instead, a landlord's loss of rent/comprehensive damage insurance may be factored into the rent demanded and/or a special type of deposit, a regulated sum of money as a bond (protected security deposit) from the tenant held by a registered third party (such as certain realty agents) may be permissible. A deposit is normally by law to be offset against arrears (rent deficits) and damage by or failures to clean/repair by the tenant.

Licensed victualler

In the United Kingdom the owner and/or manager of a pub (public house) is usually called the "landlord/landlady" or "publican", the latter properly the appellation of a Roman public contractor or tax farmer. In more formal situations, the term used is licensed victualler or simply "licensee". A female landlord can be called either a landlady or simply landlord.

The Licensed Trade Charity, formed in 2004 from the merger of the Society of Licensed Victuallers and Licensed Victualler's National Homes, exists to serve the retirement needs of Britain's pub landlords. The charity also runs three private schools in Ascot and Reading in Berkshire and Sayers Common in Sussex. As well as having normal full fee paying students, Licensed Victuallers' School in Ascot provides discounted education prices for the children of landlords and others in the catering industry.

Landlord associations
There are significant associations of landlords in various countries. These associations/societies provide support for their members in facing a range of issues 
by providing a means of mutual support, and also lobby relevant authorities and parliament with regard to the details and implementation of residential and some commercial tenancy legislation.

Australia

Numerous landlord associations exist in Australia. These associations need to be distinguished from the class of property owner associations that represent the 'big end of town'  - the owners of major buildings and very large residential housing complexes, such as the Property Council of Australia.

 Property Owners Association of Australia (POAA)
 Property Owners Association of Victoria (POAVIC) 
 POAQ - Property Owners Association of Queensland 
 Property Owners Association of NSW 
 Property Owners Association of Western Australia 
 Landlords Association of South Australia 

United Kingdom
National Residential Landlords Association (NRLA) has now formed from a merger of the two following organisations as of 31/3/2020:

 Residential Landlords Association (RLA)
 National Landlords Association (NLA)

See also

 Building superintendent, a related occupation 
 Landowner
 Tenement (law)

References

Real property law